Alion may refer to any of the following:
Leon Tomșa, Prince of Wallachia
Ion Buzdugan, Romanian writer
Alión, a Spanish winery
Alion Science and Technology, a defense contractor